Giuseppe Bernardino Bison (16 June 1762 – 24 August 1844) was an itinerant Italian painter of frescoes, landscapes, vedute, capriccios and some religious works.

Biography 
He was born in Palmanova. When he was still a boy, his family moved to Brescia, where he saw the works of Girolamo Romani and decided to become a painter. Later, his family moved again, to Venice, where he enrolled at the Accademia di Belle Arti di Venezia and worked with Costantino Cedini. While there, he became friends with the architect Gian Antonio Selva, and went with him to Ferrara in 1787 to help decorate the Palazzo Bottoni.

Shortly after, he was in Padua, working as a set designer for the Obizzi family and, in 1790, was commissioned to do decorations for the Castello del Catajo. From 1798 to 1800, he collaborated with Selva on decorations at the Palazzo Dolfin Manin in Venice.
      
In 1811, he was in Zara, working at the Palazzo del Governatore. This was followed by decorative work (now lost) at the theaters in Vipacco and Gorizia.

At this time, he began to take advantage of a growing market for paintings in the homes of well-to-do non-aristocrats and, working in conjunction with a local art dealer named Tosoni, produced a wide variety of landscapes, vedute and other genres to satisfy local tastes. His canvases were expensive, but also very large.
 
In 1831, despite his successes in Trieste, he began wandering again, returning briefly to Brescia, then settling in Milan where he took some smaller commissions, but was not very successful and died poor.

Collections 
Bison's work is held in the permanent collections of several museums, including the Cooper Hewitt, the Princeton University Art Museum, the University of Michigan Museum of Art, the Clark Art Institute, the Detroit Institute of Arts, the Allen Memorial Art Museum, the Harvard Art Museums, the Metropolitan Museum of Art, the Norton Simon Museum, the Blanton Museum of Art, and the British Museum.

Selected paintings

References

Further reading 
 Giuseppe Bergamini, Fabrizio Magani and Giuseppe Pavanello; Giuseppe Bernardino Bison: pittore e disegnatore, (Exhibition catalog, Udine, 1997-1998), Skira, 1997 
 Franca Pellegrini; Da Tintoretto a Bison: disegni del Museo d'Arte secoli XVI -XVIII, Il Poligrafo, 2005 
 Giuseppe Pavanello, Alberto Craievich and Daniele D'Anza; Giuseppe Bernardino Bison, Volume 14 of Collana d'arte della Fondazione CRTrieste, 2012 
 Daniele D'Anza; Giuseppe Bernardino Bison, un pittore dalla fantasia inesauribile nella Trieste neoclassica, Marsilio, 2013

External links 

Arcadja Auctions: Over 300 more works by Bison.

1762 births
1844 deaths
People from Palmanova
18th-century Italian painters
Italian male painters
19th-century Italian painters
Italian vedutisti
Painters of ruins
Painters from Brescia
Painters from Venice
19th-century Italian male artists
18th-century Italian male artists